The 2020–21 Colorado Buffaloes men's basketball team represented the University of Colorado in the 2020–21 NCAA Division I men's basketball season. They were led by head coach Tad Boyle in his eleventh season at Colorado. The Buffaloes played their home games at CU Events Center in Boulder, Colorado as members of the Pac-12 Conference. They finished the season 23-9, 14-6 in Pac-12 Play to finish in third place. They defeated California and USC to advance to the championship game of the Pac-12 tournament where they lost to Oregon State. They received an at-large bid to the NCAA tournament where they defeated Georgetown in the first round before losing in the second round to Florida State.

Previous season
The Buffaloes finished the 2019–20 season 21–11, 10–8 in Pac-12 play to finish in a tie for fifth place. They lost in the first round of the Pac-12 tournament to Washington State.

Off-season

Departures

Incoming transfers

2020 recruiting class

2021 Recruiting class

Roster

Schedule and results

|-
!colspan=12 style=| Regular season

|-
!colspan=12 style=| Pac-12 tournament

|-
!colspan=9 style="|NCAA tournament

Ranking movement

*AP does not release post-NCAA Tournament rankings.

References

Colorado
Colorado Buffaloes men's basketball seasons
Colorado Buffaloes
Colorado Buffaloes
Colorado